The lawn bowls competition at the 1998 Commonwealth Games took place at the National Lawn Bowls Centre, Bukit Kiara, Kuala Lumpur in Malaysia from 11 September until 21 September 1998.

Medal table

Medallists

Results

Men's singles – round robin

Section A

Section B 

+ Awarded Bronze medals

Final 
 Garden bt  Price 25-14

Men's pairs – round robin

Section A

Section B 

+ Awarded Bronze medals

Final 
 Australia bt  Wales 16-14

Men's fours – round robin

Section A

Section B 

+ Awarded Bronze medals

Final 
 Northern Ireland bt  Australia 26-21

Women's singles – round robin

Section A

Section B 

+ Awarded Bronze medals

Final 
 Hartwell bt  Rahim 25-14

Women's pairs – round robin

Section A

Section B 

+ Awarded Bronze medals

Final 
 Scotland bt  Namibia 31-8

Women's fours – round robin

Section A

Section B 

+ Awarded Bronze medals

Final 
 South Africa bt  Australia 17-16

References

See also
List of Commonwealth Games medallists in lawn bowls
Lawn bowls at the Commonwealth Games

Lawn bowls at the Commonwealth Games
1998 in bowls